Snezhnogorsk is an urban locality (an urban-type settlement) under the administrative jurisdiction of Tsentralny City District of the krai city of Norilsk in Krasnoyarsk Krai, Russia.

History
Snezhnogorsk was founded in 1963 as a settlement for the workers building the Ust-Khantaika hydroelectric plant.

Snezhnogorsk got its name during construction, when the first house built was covered with snow up to the roof.
The status of an urban-type settlement has been granted in  1964.
The city-forming enterprise is Ust-Khantai Hydroelectric Power Station with a capacity of 451 MW.

Transportation 
Snezhnogorsk is a remote settlement with  no ground transport available to reach it.
The settlement is connected by air with Norilsk and Igarka. In 2006, the airport located in the village was disbanded and the terminal building was burned down. Airplane communication between Snezhnogorsk and Norilsk thence ceased to exist.
Helicopter flights are operated weekly on Tuesdays and Thursdays by the airline  Norilsk Avia JSC on the route Norilsk - Snezhnogorsk - Norilsk. From October 1, 2007, 2 times a month, the company operates Turukhanavia helicopter flights on the route Igarka - Snezhnogorsk - Igarka.

Population history

References

Notes

Sources

Urban-type settlements in Krasnoyarsk Krai
Norilsk Urban Okrug
Road-inaccessible communities of Krasnoyarsk Krai
